Thambi Arjuna is a 2010 Tamil-language action film directed by Vijay R. Anand. The film stars Ramana, newcomer Feroz Khan and Ashima Bhalla, with Arun Pandian, Suman, newcomer Sharmila, Bala Singh and Rajendran playing supporting roles. It was released on 30 July 2010.
It is dubbed into hindi as Bhai Arjuna.

Plot

Arjuna, who studies aeronautical engineering in Australia, returns to Chennai after a two-year absence and reminisces about the events that had led him to leave the country.

Arjuna and his elder brother Dharma were orphans who were brought up by the rowdy Mani. Dharma did not want his brother Arjuna to follow in his footsteps and made his brother study aeronautical engineering. Dharma then left Mani's gang and became a powerful don. Arjuna was in love with Radhika, the daughter of Police Commissioner Vedagiri. Radhika also fell in love with him, but when she learned of his brother's profession, she felt pessimistic. To fulfil his brother's wish, Dharma requested Vedagiri to give his daughter in marriage to his brother, but Vedagiri humiliated Dharma and beat him up with his shoe. An angry Arjuna beat Vedagiri in turn with his shoe in front of Radhika and told him that he did not want to marry Radhika anymore. After this incident, Arjuna went back to Australia, and Dharma left his don life. Dharma surrendered himself to the government, and he was thus leading a peaceful life.

Back to the present, Mani sequesters Dharma and requests Arjuna to save Radhika who was abducted by a tribe, and in return, Mani promises to release his brother. Mani is in fact following Vedagiri's instruction. Arjuna then saves Radhika, who is still in love with him, but Vedagiri cannot forget the humiliation and wants to take revenge on Dharma and Arjuna. The Chief Minister gives free rein to the police to end rowdyism and orders to encounter all the rowdies, including the reformed don Dharma. The police shot all the rowdies, including Mani and Dharma's right-hand man Kaaka. The film ends with Dharma and Vedagiri shooting each other to death.

Cast

Ramana as Arjuna
Feroz Khan as Dharma
Ashima Bhalla as Radhika
Arun Pandian as Chief Minister
Suman as Vedagiri, Radhika's father
Sharmila as Bhuvana
Rajendran as Mani
Bala Singh as Kaaka
Rekha as Radhika's mother
Lollu Sabha Manohar as Manohar
Yuvarani
Usha Elizabeth
Nadhisha as Fardeena
Master Parthiban as Karthik
Master Arif as Ashok

Production
Vijay R. Anand, a former associate of actor Arun Pandian, made his directorial debut with Thambi Arjuna. Actor Ramana had undergone rigorous workout and toned his physique for the role. Malayalam actor Feroz Khan signed to play the baddie, Suman played a tough policeman while Ashima Bhalla was chosen to play the heroine. Speaking about the film, the director Vijay R. Anand said, "Women always occupied a prominent place in history. They created and destroyed many empires. 'Thambi Arjuna' is a tale of a young woman and her lover" and added, "I want my movies to do all the talking. It will be shot using state-of-the-art technology. Action sequences are the highlights of the film". During the shooting of the climax, a freak fire accident caused severe injuries and burns to the heroine Ashima Bhalla. The scene required her to be surrounded by fire and kerosene was poured around her accordingly. But suddenly due to a freak accident, the fire caught up with her and her legs were completely burned. She was then taken to the hospital immediately.

Soundtrack

The film score and the soundtrack were composed by Dhina. The soundtrack features 6 tracks with lyrics written by Na. Muthukumar, Yugabharathi and Uma Subramaniam. The audio was released on 28 April 2010 by V. C. Guhanathan and Arun Pandian received the first CD.

Release
The film was released on 30 July 2010 alongside Aaravadhu Vanam and Ilakkana Pizhai.

Critical reception

The New Indian Express said, "The first half had a tangible script to back all the sound and fury of the musical score. There are some ably choreographed chase scenes [..] In the latter part, the situations loose out on conviction, the logic lop-sides and the motivation and behaviour of the characters are confusing". S. R. Ashok Kumar of The Hindu wrote, "the director has gone wrong with the measure of essential cinematic ingredients". Behindwoods.com rated the film 1.5 out 5 and stated, "The movie has a decent script but if only it hadn’t trailed away to other banalities, it would have sustained the grip and been a better one".

Box office
The film took an average opening at the Chennai box office, beginning in the third position the first week and finishing in the fifth position the second week.

References

External links

2010 films
2010s Tamil-language films
Indian action films
Indian gangster films
Films about organised crime in India
Films shot in Chennai
Films shot in France
2010 directorial debut films
2010 action films